Percy Morgan may refer to:
Percy Morgan, a Welsh cricketer
Percy Gates Morgan, a New Zealand scientist and administrator
Percy Lewis McDonald Morgan, a Western Samoan politician